Worst of Jennifer Rostock is the first compilation album by German pop-punk band Jennifer Rostock. It was released on 29 September 2017 by Four Music. It spawns a collection of previously unreleased songs which originated in the production of their first five studio albums Ins Offene Messer (2008), Der Film (2009), Mit Haut und Haar (2011), Schlaflos (2014), and Genau in diesem Ton (2016). The album marks the last release before the band goes on hiatus from May 2018 on.

Background 
On 18 August 2017, Jennifer Rostock's Facebook account posted a picture of a blank pink square accompanied by the hashtag #wojr to state their imminent release of new music. Three days later, the band uploaded a video onto their Facebook page featuring various clips of custard pie battles and the songs "Kopf Oder Zahl", "Du Willst Mir An Die Wäsche", "Es war nicht alles schlecht", "Ein Schmerz und eine Kehle", as well as "Hengstin". The purpose of the compilation is to celebrate the first 10 years of Jennifer Rostock's career, which began with the release of their first commercial single with Warner Music, "Kopf oder Zahl", in 2008.
Track 11 to 13 are songs released on Facebook and YouTube through the last few months. Track 14 was released with the befriended band Grossstadtgeflüster via betterplace.

Promotion

Singles
Prior to its release, the lead single "Alles cool" was made available for download and streaming on 25 August 2017.
Almost one month later, the band announced via their official Facebook page a further single called "Haarspray" with a release date set for 22 September 2017. The accompanying music video premiered on 26 September 2017. Jennifer Weist revealed in an interview with 16Bars.tv that this song and "Wenn Ich Dein Gesicht Seh, Denk Ich An Meine Faust" ("When I See Your Face, I Think of My Fist") were intended to be included on their previous album Genau in diesem Ton. With the release of their third single titled "Die Guten Alten Zeiten" ("The Good Old Times") on 15 November 2017, the band announced to put the group on hold after their planned tour for 2018. The accompanying music video, directed by Michael Winkler, was shot in Weist's and Walter's hometown of Zinnowitz.

Track listing
The track listing for the album as confirmed via iTunes and Amazon.

Charts

References

2017 compilation albums
Jennifer Rostock albums
German-language albums